{{Infobox Buddha
| name                     = Virūḍhaka 
| image                    =
|image caption     = Statue of Virūḍhaka. Renge-in Tanjō-ji, Tamana, Japan. 
| sanskrit_name   = विरूढक
Virūḍhaka 
 | pali_name       = विरूळ्हक
 Virūḷhaka 
 | burmese_name    = ဝိရဠက
 | chinese_name    = 增長天王
(Pinyin: Zēngzhǎng Tiānwáng)
 | japanese_name   = 増長天 
(romaji: Zōjōten or Zōchōten)
 | karen_name      =
 | khmer_name      =
 | korean_name     = 증장천왕
(RR: Jeungjang Cheonwang)
 | mongolian_name  =
 | okinawan_name   =
 | shan_name       =
 | tagalog_name    = Birudhaka
 | thai_name       = ท้าววิรุฬหก
Thao Virunhok"
 | tibetan_name    = འཕགས་སྐྱེས་པོ<small text>Wylie: 'phags skyes poTHL: Pak Kyepo</small text>
 | vietnamese_name = Tăng Trưởng Thiên Vương
 | sinhalese_name  = විරෑඪ
 | veneration      = Theravāda
(Ātānātiya Sutta)
(Mahāsamāya Sutta)
Mahāyāna
(Golden Light Sutra)
(Lalitavistara Sūtra)
(Lotus Sutra)
(Mahāmāyūrī Vidyārājñī Sūtra)
 | attributes      = Guardian of the South
|caption=Statue of Virudhaka (增長天王), in the Hall of Four Heavenly Kings in Lingyun Temple (凌雲寺) in Leshan, Sichuan, China}}

Virūḍhaka is a major deity in Buddhism. He is one of the Four Heavenly Kings and a dharmapala.

Names
The name Virūḍhaka comes from the identical Sanskrit term, which refers to sprouting grain. As such, his name means "increase" or "growth.". Other names include:

Traditional Chinese: 增長天; simplified Chinese: 増長天; pinyin: Zēngzhǎng Tiānwáng; Japanese: Zōjōten or Zōchōten; Korean: 증장천왕 Jeungjang Cheonwang; Tagalog: Birudhaka; Vietnamese: Tăng Trưởng Thiên, a calque of Sanskrit Virūḍhaka 
Traditional Chinese: 毘楼勒叉; pinyin: Bí lóu lè chā; Japanese: Birurokusha; Korean: 비루늑차Biluneugcha; Vietnamese: Tỳ Lưu Ly. This is a transliteration of the original Sanskrit name.
Tibetan: འཕགས་སྐྱེས་པོ, Wylie: 'phags skyes po, THL: Pak Kyepo, "Noble Birth"
Thai: ท้าววิรุฬหก Thao Virunhok is an honorific plus the modern pronunciation of Pali Virūḷhaka.

Characteristics

Virūḍhaka is the guardian of the southern direction. He lives on the southern part of Sumeru. He is leader of the Kumbhanda and pretas.

Theravāda
In the Pāli Canon of Theravāda Buddhism, Virūḍhaka is called Virūlha or Virūḷhaka. Virūḷhaka is one of the Cātummahārājāno, or "Four Great Kings," each of whom rules over a specific direction.

 China 
In China, Virūḍhaka's name Zēngzhǎng Tiānwáng (增長天 lit. Growth King) is a reference to his ability to teach sentient beings to grow in compassion. In Chinese temples, he is often enshrined within the Hall of the Heavenly Kings (天王殿) with the other three Heavenly Kings. In iconographic form, he is clad in armor while brandishing a sword. He is also regarded as one of the Twenty Devas (二十諸天 Èrshí Zhūtiān) or the Twenty-Four Devas'' (二十四諸天 Èrshísì zhūtiān), a group of Buddhist dharmapalas who manifest to protect the Dharma.

Japan
In Japan, Zōjōten (増長天) is commonly depicted with a fierce expression. He is clad in armor, often brandishing a sword or spear while trampling a jaki.

References

External links

Four Heavenly Kings
Lokapalas
War gods
Twenty-Four Protective Deities